Yvonne Martin (born Yvonne Beaugé, 29 February 1912 – 8 March 1994) was a French film editor. She worked on more than sixty films between 1934 and 1985. Her mother, Marguerite Beaugé (1892–1977) was also a renowned film editor.

Selected filmography
 The Blaireau Case (1932)
 Lake of Ladies (1934)
 The Mysteries of Paris (1935)
 Under Western Eyes (1936)
 The Terrible Lovers (1936)
 Woman of Malacca (1937)
 Personal Column (1939)
 The Emigrant (1940)
 First Ball (1941)
 Angels of Sin (1943)
 That's Not the Way to Die (1946)
 The Ironmaster (1948)
 No Pity for Women (1950)
 The Paris Waltz (1950)
 The Blonde Gypsy (1953)
 The Lovers of Midnight (1953)

References

Bibliography
 Greco, Joseph. The File on Robert Siodmak in Hollywood, 1941-1951. Universal-Publishers, 1999.

External links

1912 births
1994 deaths
French film editors
French women film editors